Yusuke Yachi (born 2 January 1980) is a Japanese race walker.

He finished seventeenth at the 2007 World Championships in Osaka, in his major international debut race.

Achievements

References

1980 births
Living people
Japanese male racewalkers
20th-century Japanese people
21st-century Japanese people